Pitcairnia corallina is a species of flowering plant in the family Bromeliaceae, native to northern Brazil, Colombia and Peru. It was first described in 1873.

References

corallina
Flora of Brazil
Flora of Colombia
Flora of Peru
Plants described in 1873